José Capmany  (15 July 1961 – 13 October 2001) was a Costa Rican songwriter and guitarist. Along with Enrique Ramírez, he was a founder of the band "Café con Leche", a popular rock band in Costa Rica in the late 1980s.  His latest release "Canciones Cotidianas" included a compilation of his work. Songs like "El Barco", "La Historia Salvaje" (which contains a sample of Gloria from Them but with more hard rock and in the lyrics the complete lyric from the popular kid song "Los Pollitos" combined with the chorus). "La Modelo" and "Mamá y Papá" are considered folk rock music in Costa Rica. He died in a car accident on October 13, 2001.

Capmany is widely recognized as the most important rock musician and a cornerstone in Costa Rican rock development.  Many musicians have said they found him a source of inspiration, and most of his songs have been sung by other people as a form of tribute.

Sony Music edited a last album with Capmany's music after his death. "Volando alto/La historia salvaje" is a double disc, one with his old hits and other with unreleased songs that were completed by his bandmates.

References

External links
HELP / Hormigas en la pared <small> "Capmany represented what is original and authentic, the pioneer... the Father of National Rock"
20 Years of National Rock
Jose Capmany's Discography available for Digital Download
Cafe con Leche's Discography available for Digital Download

Costa Rican musicians
2001 deaths
1961 births
Road incident deaths in Costa Rica
20th-century guitarists